Roberto Jiménez may refer to:

 Roberto Jiménez (footballer, born 1983), Peruvian footballer
 Roberto Jiménez (footballer, born 1986), Spanish footballer
 Roberto Jimenez (grappler, born 2000), Ecuadorian Brazilian jiu-jitsu athlete